Salma Luévano is a Mexican politician and LGBT+ rights activist. She currently sits in the Chamber of Deputies as a member of the Morena caucus.

Career 
In the 1990s, Luévano was arrested by Mexican police on charges of indecency for wearing women’s clothing. Following her arrest, she became increasingly heavily involved in activist for LGBT+ rights in Mexico, eventually being named director of the Together for the Way of Diversity collective.

She also owns a beauty salon in Aguascalientes.

She ran for Morena in the 2021 Mexican legislative election, successfully winning a seat. She was one of the first two transgender women to be elected to the Mexican Parliament, along with María Clemente García, also a member of Morena and also elected in 2021.

References

Living people
Members of the Chamber of Deputies (Mexico)
21st-century Mexican politicians
Mexican LGBT politicians
LGBT legislators
Transgender politicians
Politicians from Aguascalientes
Transgender women
Mexican LGBT rights activists
Year of birth missing (living people)